Cardinal Ritter College Prep High School is a private, Roman Catholic high school in St. Louis, Missouri.  It is located in the Roman Catholic Archdiocese of Saint Louis.

Background
Cardinal Ritter Prep opened on September 6, 1979. It is named for Cardinal Joseph Ritter, Archbishop of St. Louis in the mid-20th century. From 1977–1978, a community representative task force was established by the Board of Catholic Education of the St. Louis Archdiocese to study the future existence of a Catholic school in the old Labouré location in North St. Louis. Arrangements to establish Cardinal Ritter College Prep High School as a co-educational college preparatory high school began in August 1979.

On May 18, 2003, Cardinal Justin Rigali dedicated the new Cardinal Ritter Preparatory High School adjacent to the Saint Louis University campus. The school opened for students in August 2003. Ritter Prep is ranked in the top 50% among the large private high schools in Missouri.

Location
When the school first opened, it was located in the neighborhood of Walnut Park. In 2003, a new location was opened adjacent to Saint Louis University on 701 N. Spring Ave.

Athletics
The school is in MSHSAA Class 3. The athletic conference they are a member of is the Archdiocesan Athletic Association. The school has 8 varsity sports. Sports offered here are Football, Volleyball, Dance, Cheerleading, Cross Country, Boys Basketball, Girls Basketball, Baseball, Boys Track & Field, and Girls Track & Field.

Notable alumni
 Cori Bush, politician
 Chris Carrawell, former NBA basketball player
 Darrell Jackson, record producer and DJ
 Ali Jones, rapper
 Rockwell Knuckles, rapper
 Jahidi White, basketball player
 Jameson Williams, American football player
 Loren Woods, basketball player

Notes and references

External links
 

Roman Catholic Archdiocese of St. Louis
Roman Catholic secondary schools in St. Louis
Educational institutions established in 1979
1979 establishments in Missouri